Friends II is the fifth Mini-Album by the Japanese rock duo B'z, released in 1996. The album sold 1,466,650 copies and reached No. 1 on Oricon.

Track listing 
Friends II
Snow

Baby Moon
Sasanqua ~ fuyu no hi (sasanqua ～ 冬の陽)
Aru hiso kana koi (ある密かな恋)
Kimi wo tsurete (きみをつれて)

Certifications

References 

1996 EPs
B'z EPs
Japanese-language EPs